The following is an episode list of the Australian comedy program Upper Middle Bogan, there are currently 24 episodes.

Series overview
{| class="wikitable plainrowheaders" style="text-align: center;"
|-
! scope="col" style="padding: 0 8px;" colspan="2" rowspan="2"| Series
! scope="col" style="padding: 0 8px;" rowspan="2"| Episodes
! scope="col" colspan="2"| Originally aired
! scope="col" colspan="3"| 
|-
! scope="col" | 
! scope="col" | 
! scope="col" | Region 4
|-
|scope="row" style="background:#f6f; color:#100;"| 
| 1
| 8
| 
| 
| 18 September 2013
|-
| scope="row" style="background:#999; color:#100;"|
| 2
| 8
| 
| 
| 26 November 2014
|-
| scope="row" style="background:skyblue; color:#100;"|
| 3
| 8
| 
| 
| 16 November 2016 
|-
|}

Episodes

Series 1 (2013)

Series 2 (2014)

Series 3 (2016)

Ratings

Series 1 (2013)

Series 2 (2014)

Series 3 (2016)

References

Upper Middle Bogan